Melbourne Business School (MBS) is the graduate business school of the University of Melbourne, Victoria, Australia.
The School offers an MBA program, specialist Masters programs, a doctoral program, and executive education programs.
The MBS Head Office and main campus are in the Melbourne suburb of Carlton,
walking distance from Melbourne's Central Business District, in a complex designed by Daryl Jackson.

MBS has an additional office in Pitt Street, Sydney, and a program enquiries office in Kuala Lumpur, Malaysia.

History

MBS began teaching in 1955 when the University of Melbourne offered Australia's first residential executive education program in the summer of that year. Its first Master of Business Administration (MBA) degree was awarded in 1965, which was also the first MBA degree awarded in Australia.

During the 1980s, MBS was awarded the status of a National Management School by the Australian Government and the Graduate School of Management was established within the University of Melbourne.

In 1989, it was re-organized again, this time as the Graduate School of Management Ltd: a non-profit company limited by guarantee and managed by a board of directors which includes the chairs and directors of leading Australian corporations. This organization structure has helped create a major link between the university and those who have a responsibility for management. It is currently co-owned by the University of Melbourne (45%) and Australian businesses (55%).

In 2004, Melbourne Business School Limited merged with Mt Eliza Business School, which was established in 1957, becoming the largest management education business school in Australia. 

In July 2009, the school announced that it was the subject of a proposed merger with the Graduate School of Management at the University of Melbourne. However, the proposal was decided not to proceed following opposition from MBS members in September 2009.

In October 2012 the school signed a collaboration deal with University of Melbourne, sharing resources but retaining the school's independence and the authority of the board.

MBS closed and sold its Mt Eliza campus in 2016, to concentrate on expanding the Carlton campus.

Research Centres
Centre for Business Analytics

The Centre for Business Analytics (CfBA) at Melbourne Business School was established in 2014 in response to growing global demand for analytics research and knowledge. The Centre also manages educational programs, collaborative workshops and the School's Master of Business Analytics program. The CfBA is headed by Professor Ujwal Kayande.

Centre for Sustainability and Business

The Centre for Sustainability and Business at Melbourne Business School was established in 2020 to support the development of sustainability in business. the Centre brings together leaders to develop the networks and comprehensive skill-sets needed to advance the practice of sustainability in business. The CSaB is header by Professor Glen Hoetker.

Notable alumni

Brent Chapman, founder of Majordomo, MBA 2003
Ahmed Fahour, CEO of Australia Post, MBA 1993
Christine Kilpatrick, CEO, Royal Children's Hospital Melbourne, Senior Executive MBA, 2007
Margaret Jackson, former chairman Qantas, MBA 1982
Katie Lahey, Former chief executive, Business Council of Australia, Senior Executive MBA 1988
Michael Phelan, Chief Police Officer, Australian Federal Police, Senior Executive MBA, 2009
Bill Shorten, Australian politician, MBA 2001
John Elliott, Former CEO of Elders IXL and Carlton & United Breweries (now Carlton & United Beverages)
Paul Rizzo, group managing director of Telstra, MBA 1969
Ross Oakley, former CEO of the AFL
Adam Garone, founder, Movember, Master of Marketing 1999

Board of directors
MBS is unique among Australian business school's because of its hybrid ownership structure. The School is owned by Melbourne Business School Ltd, a non-profit organisation that is 55 per cent owned by the business community and 45 per cent owned by the University of Melbourne. The board of directors of MBS Ltd:
 Mr Ross Barker (Chairman). Appointed: 2011
 Mr Anthony Ray Burgess. Appointed: 2013
Mr Jan Craps. Appointed: 2018
Dr Jackie Fairley. Appointed: 2010
 Professor Ian Harper. Appointed: 2018
Mr Dean Ireland. Appointed: 2014
Mr Robert Johanson. Appointed 2017
 Ms Annette Kimmitt. Appointed: 2011
Professor Paul Kofman. Appointed: 2013
 Mr Cameron Leitch. Appointed: 2017
 Professor Geoff Martin. (Appointed 2020)
 Mr Geoff Lord. Appointed: 2015
Mr Duncan Maskell. Appointed 2018
 Mr Scott Tanner. Appointed: 2011
Dr Lynne Williams. Appointed 2020
 Mr Frank Zipfinger. Appointed: 2009

References

Sources
Source: Conferring of Degrees, University of Melbourne, March 2007.
Melbourne Business School (2007). MBS Facts & Figures. Retrieved 22 February 2007.
Financial Times. FT Global MBA Rankings.
Melbourne Business School (2009). Proposed Merger.  Retrieved 4 August 2009.
Melbourne Business School (2009). .  Retrieved 14 November 2009.

External links
 Melbourne Business School website

Business schools in Australia
University of Melbourne